An articulated robot is a robot with rotary joints (e.g. a legged robot or an industrial robot).  Articulated robots can range from simple two-jointed structures to systems with 10 or more interacting joints and materials.
They are powered by a variety of means, including electric motors.

Some types of robots, such as robotic arms, can be articulated or non-articulated.

Articulated robots in action

Definitions 
Articulated Robot:
See Figure. An articulated robot uses all the three revolute joints to access its work space.
Usually the joints are arranged in a “chain”, so that one joint supports another further in the chain.

Continuous Path:
A control scheme whereby the inputs or commands specify every point along a desired path of motion. The path is controlled by the coordinated motion of the manipulator joints.

Degrees Of Freedom  (DOF):
The number of independent motions in which the end effector can move, defined by the number of axes of motion of the manipulator.

Gripper:
A device for grasping or holding, attached to the free end of the last manipulator link; also called the robot’s hand or end-effector.

Payload:
The maximum payload is the amount of weight carried by the robot manipulator at reduced speed while maintaining rated precision. Nominal payload is measured at maximum speed while maintaining rated precision. These ratings are highly dependent on the size and shape of the payload.

Pick And Place Cycle:
See Figure. Pick and place Cycle is the time, in seconds, to execute the following motion sequence: Move down one inch, grasp a rated payload; move up one inch; move across twelve inches; move down one inch; ungrasp; move up one inch; and return to start location.

Reach:
The maximum horizontal distance from the center of the robot base to the end of its wrist.

Accuracy:
See Figure. The difference between the point that a robot is trying to achieve and the actual resultant position. Absolute accuracy is the difference between a point instructed by the robot control system and the point actually achieved by the manipulator arm, while repeatability is the cycle-to-cycle variation of the manipulator arm when aimed at the same point.

Repeatability:
See Figure. The ability of a system or mechanism to repeat the same motion or achieve the same points when presented with the same control signals. The cycle-to-cycle error of a system when trying to perform a specific task. Repeatability of this robot lies between 0.1 to 0.5mm with the payload between 5kg to 100kg.

Resolution:
See Figure. The smallest increment of motion or distance that can be detected or controlled by the control system of a mechanism.
The resolution of any joint is a function of encoder pulses per revolution and drive ratio, and dependent on the distance between the tool center point and the joint axis.

Robot Program:
A robot communication program for IBM and compatible personal computers. Provides terminal emulation and utility functions. This program can record all of the user memory, and some of the system memory to disk files.

Maximum Speed:
The compounded maximum
speed of the tip of a robot moving at full extension with all joints moving simultaneously in complementary directions. This speed is the theoretical maximum and should under no circumstances be used to estimate cycle time for a particular application. A better measure of real world speed is the standard twelve inch pick and place cycle time. For critical applications, the best indicator of achievable cycle time is a physical simulation.

Servo Controlled:
Controlled by a driving signal
which is determined by the error between the mechanism's present position and the desired output position.

Via Point:
A point through which the robot's tool should pass without stopping; via points are programmed in order to move beyond obstacles or to bring the arm into a lower inertia posture for part of the motion.

Work Envelope:
A  three-dimensional
shape that defines the boundaries that the robot manipulator can reach; also known as reach envelope.

See also
 Degrees of freedom (engineering)
 Articulated soft robotics
 Robotics suite
 Industrial robot
 Robotic arms and cranes used in spaceflight:
 Canadarm, which was used on the Space Shuttle
 Mobile Servicing System (MSS), also known as the Canadarm2, used on the ISS
 European Robotic Arm, a fourth robotic arm to be installed on the ISS in 2017
 The Japanese Remote Manipulator System, used on the ISS JEM module Kibo
 Dextre, also known as the Special Purpose Dexterous Manipulator (SPDM), used on the ISS
 Strela, a manually operated arm used on the Russian Orbital Segment (ROS) of the ISS to perform similar tasks as the Mobile Servicing System

References

 
Robot kinematics
-